Allan Juel Larsen (21 November 1931 – 11 February 2017) was a Danish cyclist. He competed in the time trial event at the 1956 Summer Olympics.

References

External links
 

1931 births
2017 deaths
Danish male cyclists
Olympic cyclists of Denmark
Cyclists at the 1956 Summer Olympics
Sportspeople from Frederiksberg